Chishui River (historically) is a major tributary of the upper Yangtze. Its name literally means "red water river"/"red river" because it shows reddish color in lower stream due to a large sediment concentration. With the source in Yunnan Province, it forms part of the boundary between the provinces of Guizhou and Sichuan and flows into Yangtze River in Sichuan. It is sometimes called the River of Wines since there are several types of famous Chinese wines, including Lang Wine, Xi Wine and Maotai, originated along the river. It is also known as the field of a major battle commanded by Mao Zedong in 1935 during the Long March of Red Army.  The Jiming Three Provinces Bridge is being built where 3 provinces of Sichuan, Guizhou, and Yunnan meet.

Notes

References

Tributaries of the Yangtze River
Rivers of Yunnan
Rivers of Guizhou
Rivers of Sichuan
Geography of Zhaotong